Qarah Dagh (also Romanized as Qarah Dāgh and Qareh Dāgh) is a village in Mokriyan-e Sharqi Rural District, in the Central District of Mahabad County, West Azerbaijan Province, Iran. At the 2006 census, its population was 887, in 163 families.

References 

Populated places in Mahabad County